Limmie & Family Cookin' was an American family soul and pop group from Canton, Ohio.

History
Although Limmie Snell was born in Dalton, Alabama, his family moved to Canton when he was very young. He recorded with Columbia Records from age 11 as a solo artist before joining his sisters, Jimmie and Martha, to form the Limmie & Family Cookin'. They released one single on Scepter Records, then signed with Avco Embassy, where they released three singles which hit the UK Singles Chart in 1973-74: "You Can Do Magic" (UK No. 3), "Dreamboat" (UK No. 31), and "A Walking Miracle" (UK No. 6). The last of them was a cover version of a song by The Essex. Despite their success in the United Kingdom, they dented the US charts only once, with "You Can Do Magic" (No. 84 on the Billboard Hot 100 and No. 42 on the Billboard R&B chart). Their releases were primarily produced by Sandy Linzer and Steve Metz.

Because of their popularity in the UK, they continued performing there regularly into the 1980s. They split into two musical ensembles, the second of which was formed in 1976 under the name Limmie Funk Limited. Its line-up consisted of Limmie on vocals, Nick Straker aka Nick Bailey on keyboards, Pete Hammond on bass guitar, Gary Andrews on percussion, Andy Gierus on guitar and Phil Towner on drums.

Limmie Snell died on May 27, 1986, at age 37.

Jimmie Snell (born December 11, 1946, in Newton, Alabama), died on March 12, 2016, at age 69.

"You Can Do Magic"
"You Can Do Magic" was the biggest of three hit singles Limmie & Family Cookin' had in the UK charts in the 1970s. In 1997, the track was covered by Mike Stock under the name The Mojams, for an investigation on ITV programme The Cook Report into chart rigging. Fronted by Edwina Currie's daughter Debbie (then a trainee journalist for the production company Central Television), the single, credited to The Mojams featuring Debbie Currie, was released by Gotham Records and peaked at number 86 in the UK singles chart.

Discography

Singles

See also
List of performances on Top of the Pops

References

External links
 

Musical groups from Ohio
American pop music groups
Avco Records artists